Palamarchuk (Сyrillic: Паламарчук) is a Ukrainian surname. It is an occupational surname of patronymic derivation, based on the occupation of palamar (паламар), or 'sacristan' and literally meaning "child of sacristan". Other Ukrainian surnames of similar derivation are Palamar, Palamarenko, Ponomarenko and Ponomarchuk.

It may refer to the following people:
Dmytro Palamarchuk (born 1979), Ukrainian figure skater
Luka Palamarchuk (1906–1985), Ukrainian Soviet-era politician, journalist and diplomat.
Oleksiy Palamarchuk (born 1991), Ukrainian football player
Valeriy Palamarchuk (born 1963), Ukrainian football player
Wally Palmar (born as Volodymyr Palamarchuk in 1954), American musician, singer, songwriter and composer.

References

See also
 

Occupational surnames
Ukrainian-language surnames
Surnames of Ukrainian origin